Sagadahoc County is a county located in the U.S. state of Maine. As of the 2020 census, the population was 36,699.  Its county seat is Bath. In geographic area, it is the smallest county in Maine.

Sagadahoc County is part of the Portland–South Portland, ME Metropolitan Statistical Area.

History

Exploration and settlement
Sagadahoc County was initially part of York and, later, Lincoln County before being set off and incorporated in 1854. The name comes from the "Sagadahoc River", an early name for the Kennebec River. Samuel de Champlain led the first known visit of Europeans to the region.  In 1607, the English Popham Colony was established in what is now Phippsburg; it was abandoned a year later, but English fishermen and trappers continued to visit the area. John Smith explored the region in 1614 and reported back to King Charles I, who named the Sagadahoc area "Leethe."

When the Plymouth Council for New England was dissolved in 1635,  on the east side of the Kennebec River were divided up and granted to private owners. Over the years, these proprietors extended their claims through additional land grants, purchases from Native Americans, and exploitation of the often poorly defined boundaries of their lands. By 1660, Englishmen held the titles to the whole of what is now Sagadahoc County.

When King Philip’s War broke out in 1675, the plundering of one house was the only hostile act in Sagadahoc County until August, 1676, at which point three settlements were attacked and 53 people taken captive by Native Americans. The region was almost totally abandoned by settlers, and no permanent settlement was established until 1715, when Arrowsic and Brunswick were founded. Scotch-Irish Presbyterians began immigrating to the region in increasingly large numbers, though occasional violence persisted until 1759, when the French and Indian Wars ended in Maine.

Later conflicts
There were no significant conflicts in Sagadahoc during the American Revolutionary War, despite fear of attack from British cruisers. Two British armed vessels sailed up the Kennebec River toward Bath, but turned back after being attacked. In the War of 1812, the capture of HMS Boxer occurred nearby. During the Civil War the county furnished to the Union forces 2,488 men.

Nineteenth century
Steam power was first used on the Kennebec as early as 1818 for propelling boats. What became the Bath branch of the Maine Central Railroad was completed in 1849; and the Knox and Lincoln Railroad was opened in 1871. The first newspaper was published in the county in 1820.

Sagadahoc County was set off from Lincoln and incorporated in 1854, with Bath as the county seat. Its valuation in 1870 was $11,041,340. In 1880 it was $10,297,215. The polls in 1870 numbered 4,669, and in 1880, 5,182. The population in 1870 was 18,803. In 1880 it was 19,276.

From 1880 to 2000, the county's population nearly doubled to 35,214.

Geography
It is the smallest county in Maine by area.

Adjacent counties
Kennebec County – north
Lincoln County – east
Cumberland County – west
Androscoggin County – northwest

National protected area
 Pond Island National Wildlife Refuge

Demographics

2000 census
As of the census of 2000, there were 35,214 people, 14,117 households, and 9,641 families living in the county. There were 16,489 housing units at an average density of 65 per square mile (25/km2). The racial makeup of the county was 96.49% White, 0.92% Black or African American, 0.31% Native American, 0.63% Asian, 0.06% Pacific Islander, 0.38% from other races, and 1.21% from two or more races. 1.11% of the population were Hispanic or Latino of any race.

There were 14,117 households, out of which 33.20% had children under the age of 18 living with them, 54.60% were married couples living together, 9.60% had a female householder with no husband present, and 31.70% were non-families. 25.20% of all households were made up of individuals, and 9.30% had someone living alone who was 65 years of age or older.  The average household size was 2.47 and the average family size was 2.96.

In the county, the population was spread out, with 25.80% under the age of 18, 6.60% from 18 to 24, 30.50% from 25 to 44, 24.90% from 45 to 64, and 12.30% who were 65 years of age or older.  The median age was 38 years. For every 100 females, there were 96.30 males.  For every 100 females age 18 and over, there were 93.10 males.

The median income for a household in the county was $41,908, and the median income for a family was $49,714. Males had a median income of $34,039 versus $24,689 for females. The per capita income for the county was $20,378.  About 6.90% of families and 8.60% of the population were below the poverty line, including 12.20% of those under age 18 and 6.40% of those age 65 or over.

22.0% were of English, 11.6% Irish, 11.1% French, 10.6% United States or American, 8.0% French Canadian and 7.3% German ancestry according to Census 2000. 96.1% spoke English and 2.2% French as their first language.

According to the Maine Center for Disease Control and Prevention, Sagadahoc County has the lowest rate of immunization of two-year-olds in the state, at 26%, only a third of the statewide average of 75% and more than 30% lower than the next lowest county in the state.

2010 census
As of the 2010 United States census, there were 35,293 people, 15,088 households, and 9,869 families living in the county. The racial makeup of the county was 96.2% white, 0.8% Asian, 0.7% black or African American, 0.4% American Indian, 0.3% from other races, and 1.6% from two or more races. Those of Hispanic or Latino origin made up 1.3% of the population. In terms of ancestry, 26.9% were English, 16.8% were Irish, 11.8% were German, 8.1% were French Canadian, 6.6% were Italian, 6.5% were Scottish, and 6.4% were American.

Of the 15,088 households, 28.4% had children under the age of 18 living with them, 51.2% were married couples living together, 10.1% had a female householder with no husband present, 34.6% were non-families, and 27.1% of all households were made up of individuals. The average household size was 2.32 and the average family size was 2.81. The median age was 44.1 years.

The median income for a household in the county was $55,486 and the median income for a family was $66,650. Males had a median income of $46,068 versus $35,107 for females. The per capita income for the county was $26,983. About 5.7% of families and 8.8% of the population were below the poverty line, including 12.0% of those under age 18 and 7.4% of those age 65 or over.

Politics

State senators representing Sagadahoc County
Senator Pamela Cahill, R-Woolwich, 1986–1994
Pamela Cahill was elected to the Maine Senate following three terms in the Maine House of Representatives of Representatives. She served in leadership positions, both as Assistant Minority Leader and Minority Leader. She ran unsuccessfully for the Republican nomination for governor in the Maine gubernatorial election, 1994. She was twice elected Assistant Secretary of the Maine Senate, in both 1994 and 2000. She also served as Chairwoman of the Maine Republican Party.
Senator Mary Small, R-Bath, 1994–2002
Mary Small was elected to the Maine Senate in 1994 with over 55% of the vote. In the three succeeding elections Small was easily reelected, receiving over 60% in each election. She had previously served in the Maine House of Representatives, representing her hometown of Bath. In her final term, Small served as Republican floor leader in an equally divided senate.
Senator Arthur Mayo III, R/D-Bath, 2002–2006
Republican Arthur Mayo was elected to the Maine Senate in 2002, succeeding Mary Small. He was reelected in 2004. Following the election, Mayo changed his party registration, becoming a Democrat and joining the Democrat Caucus. He became the first Democrat to represent Sagadahoc County in the state senate in over two decades. In 2006, he was defeated by a political newcomer and small business owner, Paula Benoit. 
Senator Paula Benoit, R-Phippsburg, 2006–2008
Paula Benoit was elected to the Maine Senate in 2006, besting incumbent senator Arthur Mayo. Mayo's change in registration was a major issue in the campaign. As senator, Benoit worked on a variety of issues, most notably the rights of the adopted. She was nationally recognized for her work. In 2008, she faced a strong challenge from Richmond selectman Seth Goodall. Following her senate service, Benoit went on to serve as executive director of AdopteeCARE. She also served as director of the Blaine House. In 2013, following Goodall's resignation, Benoit sought her former senate seat.
Senator Seth Goodall, D-Richmond, 2008–2013
Seth Goodall was elected to the Maine Senate in 2008, narrowly besting Paula Benoit by a margin of 162 votes. He was reelected in 2010, and again in 2012. Following the 2012 elections, he served as State Senate Majority Leader. He resigned in 2013 to become the regional administrator of the Small Business Administration. 
Senator Eloise Vitelli, D-Arrowsic, 2013–2014
 Eloise Vitelli was elected to the Maine Senate in the special election to replace Senator Goodall. She previously served as chairwoman of the Sagadahoc County Democrats.
Senator Linda Baker, R-Topsham, 2014–2017
 Linda Baker was elected to the Maine Senate in 2014, defeating the incumbent state senator Eloise Vitelli and former Richmond selectwoman Alice Knapp. She previously served as chairwoman of the Maine Legislature's Joint Standing Committee on Marine Resources.
Senator Eloise Vitelli, D-Arrowsic, 2017–Present
 Eloise Vitelli was elected again as Democratic State Senator in Maine's 23rd District in November 2016 and again in November 2020. Eloise Vitelli was chosen to be the Assistant Majority Leader in December 2020.

Voter Registration

Presidential election results

|}

Communities

City
Bath (county seat)

Towns
Arrowsic
Bowdoin
Bowdoinham
Georgetown
Phippsburg
Richmond
Topsham
West Bath
Woolwich

Unorganized territory
Perkins Township (Swan Island)

Census-designated places
Bowdoinham
Richmond
Topsham

See also
National Register of Historic Places listings in Sagadahoc County, Maine

References

External links
Sagadahoc County government
Maine Genealogy: Sagadahoc County, Maine

 
Maine counties
Maine placenames of Native American origin
1854 establishments in Maine
Portland metropolitan area, Maine
Populated places established in 1854